Teenager is the third studio album by Fujifabric, released on January 23, 2008, on the Capitol Records label. The majority of the songs featured on the album are written by Masahiko Shimura, with the exception of "Kinen Shashin", "B.O.I.P." ("Battle of Inokashira Park") and "Mabataki", which are written by guitarist Sōichirō Yamauchi. The song "Chocolate Panic" is co-written by Roger Joseph Manning Jr. who is also featured on the track. "Hoshifuru Yoru ni Nattara" is co-written by keyboard player Daisuke Kanazawa.

Track listing
 
 
 "B.O.I.P."
 
 "Chocolate Panic"
 "Strawberry Shortcakes"
 "Surfer King"
 
 
  (Album Mix)
 
 
 "Teenager"

Chart positions

References 

Fujifabric albums
2008 albums